X Factor is an Albanian television music competition to find new singing talents. The first season began on 8 January 2012 on TV Klan.

Based on the UK format, the competition consists of auditions, in front of producers and then the judges with a live audience; bootcamp; judges' houses and then the live finals. Auditions for the show began in September and concluded in October 2011. The show is hosted by Albanian singer Alketa Vejsiu, while the judging panel consists of the biggest Albanian artists. Albanian famous writer, composer and TV presenter Pandi Laço, Albanian Kosovar pop singer Vesa Luma, Albania's representative at the 2010 Eurovision Song Contest Juliana Pasha and the Albanian superstar Alban Skënderaj. The winner of the first season of X factor Albania was Sheila Haxhiraj.

Judges
The X Factor's host television Klan invited over 10 Albanian artists to be a part of The X Factor judging panel. It was rumored that Albanian singer Aurela Gaçe will be a judge/mentor. But, after giving birth to her first child, Aurela posted in Facebook that she will be staying with her family the whole month.  Until the show started, the judges were not confirmed. In Vlorë auditions, Besa Kokëdhima was a "Guest-judge" even though, she was rumored to be a part of the judging panel. While the current judge, Vesa Luma to an interview, she told that she was only a guest in X Factor first, but later she was asked to be a part of it. Later that month, Vesa did not continue the contract with Digitalb, where she was signed. In Summer of 2011, Vesa was entertaining Albanian public on "E Diell" in Top Channel, a part of Digitalb platform. After not continuing the contract with Digitalb, she accepted the offer to be a judge on X Factor. Vesa is an Albanian singer from Kosovo, she is known for her hit song, "Jemi dhe S'jemi", which hit the charts in Balkan. In 2006 that song was awarded as the Best Song in Kosovo for 2006 in Videofest.

Albanian singer Juliana Pasha, was on the cover of Eurovision magazines, that she will be a guest judge. Later that week, she was officially asked to be a permanent mentor. Juliana represented Albania in the 2010 Eurovision Song Contest in Oslo, Norway. She got through to the final, finishing 16th.

While Pandi Laço was in every audition around Albania, after TV Klan released the news, he was officially a judge. Pandi is an Albanian writer, composer and previously a TV presenter. He is four-time winner in Festivali i Këngës for his songs. He wrote three Albanian Eurovision songs, Tomorrow I Go by Ledina Çelo, Hear My Plea by Frederik Ndoci and Zemrën e lamë peng by Olta Boka. Since a couple of years, Pandi has started his own show in TV Klan, about Albanian culture in film.

The biggest superstar in Albania Alban Skënderaj, was rumored to be a judge, since the beginning of the show. His fiancé Miriam Cani, Albanian-German singer, who is currently a judge in The Voice of Albania, to an interview told that it has been difficult to be away in two major shows in Albania. Skënderaj it is one of the most followed Albanian singers. He's songs "Let Me Die With You", "Vetëm ti" and many more, were hits in Albania in previous years.

Selection process

Auditions
Audition process was based on the British and American version. First up were "The Producer's Audition", where the producers chose singers to proceed to the second phase which was "The Audition before the Judging panel". The Auditions took place in the biggest centers of Albania, including Kosovo's capital Pristina. The producer's auditions started in September 2011, while the Auditions before the judging panel started in October. The Producer's auditions took place in over 10 cities of Albania, including Pogradec, Durrës and Korçë.

The first city to start the auditions was Vlora in 11 and 12 October 2011. It was announced that there was over 3,000 applicants, where 800 got to perform. The auditions were held in the city's Palace of Sports. From the southern capital of Albania, judges traveled to the northern capital of Albania, Shkodër. The auditions in Shkodra took place in 17 and 18 October 2011. The auditions took place in the "Migjeni" theatre. In 25 and 26 October, judges moved to Albania's center city Elbasan. The auditions took place in the city's Palace of Sports.

After that, the judges left Albania and went to Pristina. The auditions took place in "Palace of Youth Complex" in Amphitheater Studios on 29 October. From the producer's auditions, there were 10 qualifiers.

The last city to hold the auditions was Albania's capital and biggest city Tirana. The auditions took place in Klan Television Studios from 1–4 November 2011.

Bootcamp
The Bootcamp phase was broadcast on 12 February. There were 150 contestants in Bootcamp from each category. In the first day, the producers of the show decided to test the participants on dancing, by telling them that the only way to proceed in the Judges' houses would be by dancing. But, after the time passed on midnight, the producers told the participants it was just a joke. However, after each contestant performed once and by group performing, the judges advanced 32 participants for the judges houses.

Judges' houses
Two days after the phase of Bootcamp was over, the producers of X Factor, telephoned each judge to communicate the category they would coach. Alban Skënderaj took the Boys category, Vesa Luma took the Over 23s, Juliana Pasha got the Girls category while Pandi Laço got the Groups category.
The judges traveled to several cities of Albania, while Juliana Pasha traveled to Venice, Italy. Pandi Laço, who got the Groups Category, chose only 7 acts in Bootcamp, making thirty one participants in Judges' houses. The results were shown in the second week of the Judge's houses where 16 acts proceeded to the live shows.

The 15 eliminated acts were:
 Boys: Dritan Maraj, Gentian Deda, Leotrim Zejnullahu, Rezart Saliasi
 Girls: Antonela Çekixhi, Flaka Salihaj, Maria Prifti, Sigi Bastri
 Over 23s: Anxhela Dusha, Doriana Bircaj, Edmond Themeli, Florian Kollaj
 Groups: Different Girls, New Born, X Angels

Contestants
The top 16 contestants were confirmed as follows;

Key:
 – Winner
 – Runner up
 – Third Place

Live shows
After four phases of selection and audition, X Factor arrived to the Live Shows. Sixteen acts proceeded to this round, four from each category. The
first live show began on 3 March.

Results summary

Color key

Live show details

Week 1 (4 March 2012)
The first live show was held on 4 March in Klan Studios in Tirana. For the first time, X Factor debuted a high definition format in TV Klan; the show was broadcast entirely in 1080i HD. After sixteen artists performed, the host of the show, Alketa Vejsiu, communicated to the public that the X Factor Albania producers, in collaboration with the producers of The X Factor, decided to eliminate none of the performers.

Week 2 (11 March 2012)

Judge's vote to eliminate
 Skënderaj: Red Roses
 Laço: Arianit Bellopoja
 Pasha: Red Roses
 Luma: Red Roses

Week 3 (18 March 2012)

Judge's vote to eliminate
 Laço: Arianit Bellopoja
 Skënderaj: X Group
 Pasha: X Group
 Luma: Arianit Bellopoja

Week 4 (25 March 2012)

Judge's vote to eliminate
 Skënderaj: Matilda Shushari
 Pasha: Matilda Shushari
 Luma: Savjana Vjerdha
 Laço: Matilda Shushari

Week 5 (1 April 2012)

Judge's vote to eliminate
 Skënderaj: Gerald Zyfi
 Luma: Kristo Thano
 Pasha: Gerald Zyfi
 Laço: Gerald Zyfi

Week 6 (8 April 2012)

Judge's vote to eliminate
 Luma: Amarildo Shahinaj
 Skënderaj: Besa Breca
 Pasha: Besa Breca
 Laço: Besa Breca

Week 7 (15 April 2012)

Judge's vote to eliminate
 Pasha: Focus
 Laço: Xhesika Polo
 Luma: Focus
 Skënderaj: Focus

Week 8 (22 April 2012)

Judge's vote to eliminate
 Pasha: Amarildo Shahinaj
 Luma: Anxhelo Miho
 Laço: Amarildo Shahinaj
 Skënderaj: Anxhelo Miho

Week 9 (29 April 2012)

Judge's vote to eliminate
 Pasha: Savjana Vjerdha
 Skënderaj: Savjana Vjerdha
 Luma: Xhesika Polo
 Laço: Savjana Vjerdha

Week 10 (6 May 2012)

Judge's vote to eliminate
 Skënderaj: X Group
 Laço: Anxhelo Miho
 Luma: Anxhelo Miho
 Pasha: Anxhelo Miho

Week 11 (13 May 2012)

Judge's vote to eliminate
 Pasha: X Group
 Laço: Festina Mejzini
 Luma: X Group
 Skënderaj: X Group

Week 12 (20 May 2012)

Judge's vote to eliminate
 Pasha: Lirije Rashiti
 Luma: Sheila Haxhiraj
 Laço: Lirije Rashiti
 Skënderaj: Lirije Rashiti

References

X Factor (Albanian TV series)
2012 Albanian television seasons
Albania 01